John Micallef (1923–2003) was a Maltese philosopher. Although his thoughts remained philosophically grounded in the Christian tradition, he was primarily interested in Existentialism.

Life
Micallef was born in Victoria, Gozo, one of Malta's subsidiary islands, in 1923. After completing his studies at the Lyceum in Malta, he continued studying at the Gregorian University of Rome. From Gregorian, he acquired a Masters in Philosophy. He also studied philosophy at Heythop College in London, England. From the University of London he acquired a Bachelor of Arts in Italian Language, and another Master’s degree in Linguistics. He completed "3rd cycle" studies at Laval University in Quebec City, receiving a Doctorate in Philosophy. From the University of Western Colorado in the United States of America he acquired, in 1973, a second Doctorate in Arts. In 1980, he also acquired a Masters in Christian Studies from Regent College of Vancouver, British Columbia, Canada. In addition to his prior studies, he pursued further coursework at the University of Oña, in Spain, and at the University of Innsbruck, in Austria.

During the fifties, Dr.John Micallef was a teacher of languages. He was elected and he served for some time as Member of the Malta Legislative Assembly before he  emigrated from Malta to Canada in 1964. He eventually settled in Nelson, British Columbia, and then in Oregon, United States. In Nelson, he was Associate Professor of Philosophy at Notre Dame University of Nelson. He was also Associate Professor of Philosophy at the University of Portland, and at Mount Angel College, both in Oregon. Micallef died in 2003 in Vancouver, BC Canada.

Work
Philosophy of Existence, was published in 1969 (Philosophical Library, New York, U.S.A.). As its title indicates, in this 225-page composition, Micallef reveals his thorough Existentialist perspective. The book is basically divided into four parts, each one sub-divided into chapters.

The composition is a highly elaborate philosophical exercise into the nature of existence. Successively, Micallef deals with the affirmation of existence, the process of existence, the properties of existence, and the dialectics of existence.

Unfortunately, since the book was issued abroad, it has been seldom read in Malta. Consequently, its influence on the Maltese philosophical tradition has been relatively slight.

Additional publications by John Micallef are: "No Destination- A Travellers Way" - a collection of poems and "Joy is my Gift"  a collection of poems.

Dr. Micallef was a prolific writer who produced numerous finished manuscripts and plays most of which remain unpublished to date.

References

Sources
 Mark Montebello, Il-Ktieb tal-Filosofija f’Malta (A Source Book of Philosophy in Malta), PIN Publications, Malta, 2001.
 Mark Montebello, Malta’s Philosophy & Philosophers, PIN Publications, Malta, 2011.

See also
Philosophy in Malta

20th-century Maltese philosophers
People from Victoria, Gozo
Pontifical Gregorian University alumni
Alumni of the University of London
University of Portland faculty
Mount Angel Seminary
1923 births
2003 deaths
Existentialists
Maltese emigrants to Canada
Maltese expatriates in Italy
Maltese expatriates in the United Kingdom